Amaku Kiken na Kaori  (あまく危険な香り, Sweet & Dangerous Scent) is the ninth single by Japanese singer-songwriter Tatsuro Yamashita, released in April 1982. This was his last single under the AIR/RVC label.

Overview

Amaku Kiken na Kaori was used as the theme song for the Japanese drama series of the same name.

This song was included in his Greatest hits album Greatest Hits! of Tatsuro Yamashita, Opus (All Time Best 1975-2012). The remastered reissue of For You contains an instrumental version and a one-shot long version recorded for BGM. The reissue of Ride on Time also included a karaoke version and the live album Joy contains a live version of the song. Meanwhile, "Music Book" is taken from his studio album For You. It is said that this song was transcribed from a passage called "Music Book" that Minako Yoshida wrote down in her notebook.

Yamashita originally wrote this song with the intention of having someone veteran singer sing it, but at the recommendation of director Ryuzo Kosugi, he said that he would release it as his own single, and the low-pitched piano phrase of the interlude. It seems that the tune of the "adult line", which had never existed before, seemed to be fresh on the contrary.

Eizin Suzuki made the art for the jacket. The front cover design features a Schlitz beer and the sign at the horizon mostly resembles "Bob's Cafe" sign located at Sioux Falls, South Dakota. In 2019, the sign was removed and made for sale. In the back cover, the advertisement for the album For You can be seen.

Track listing

Personnel

Amaku Kiken na Kaori
Tatsuro Yamashita: Electric Guitar (Left), Acoustic Piano (Solo) & Percussion
Jun Aoyama: Drums
Koki Ito: Bass
Tsunehide Matsuki: Electric Guitar (Right)
Hiroyuki Namba: Keyboards
Motoya Hamaguchi: Percussion
Shin Kazuhara: Trumpet
Masahiro Kobayashi: Trumpet
Shigeharu Mukai: Trombone
Tadanori Konakawa: Trombone
Takeru Muraoka: Tenor Sax
Shunzo Sunahara: Baritone Sax
Tadaaki Ohno: Strings Concert Master
Koji Hajima: Conductor
Strings arranged by Masahide Sakuma

Music Book
(from the album For You)
Tatsuro Yamashita: Percussion & Background Vocals
Yuichi Togashiki: Drums
Akira Okazawa: Bass
Tsunehide Matsuki: Electric Guitar
Hiroshi Sato: Electric Piano
Motoya Hamaguchi: Percussion
Shigeharu Mukai: Trombone Solo
Minako Yoshida: Background Vocals
Shin Kazuhara: Trumpet
Masahiro Kobayashi: Trumpet
Yasuo Hirauchi: Trombone
Sumio Okada: Trombone
Takeru Muraoka: Tenor Sax
Shunzo Sunahara: Baritone Sax
Tadaaki Ohno: Strings Concert Master

Chart positions

Weekly charts

Year-end charts

Release history

References

Song articles with missing songwriters
Japanese songs
Japanese pop songs
1982 singles